2017 World Taekwondo Grand Slam - Open Qualification Tournament is an international G-1 taekwondo tournament which allows the first three athletes to compete on the 2017 World Taekwondo Grand Slam as 9th, 10th and 11th seeds on their respective weight category brackets. The tournament was held from 23-24 November in Wuxi, China.

Medal summary

Men

Women

Medal table

References 

World Taekwondo Grand Slam
Grand Slam
World Taekwondo Grand Slam
International sports competitions hosted by China
Sport in Wuxi
World Taekwondo Grand Slam